Kirill Vikentievich Lemokh, also known as Carl Johann Lemoch (Russian: Кирилл Викентьевич Лемох: 1841–1910) was a Russian genre painter and member of the Imperial Academy of Arts.

Biography 
His father was a music teacher from Germany. From 1851 to 1856, he studied at the Moscow School of Painting, Sculpture and Architecture under . In 1858, he entered the Imperial Academy of Arts, where he studied history painting with Pyotr Basin and Alexey Tarasovich Markov.

Five years later, in 1863, he participated in what came to be known as the "Revolt of the Fourteen", a protest by those who preferred the Realistic style over the Classical style being promoted by the academy. As a result, he withdrew from the academy with the degree of Artist Second-Class. He joined the Artel of Artists, led by Ivan Kramskoi. Five years later, he entered an academy competition and became an Artist First-Class. From that point on, he earned his living by giving drawing lesson to aristocratic families and built an art studio in Khovrino, where he spent his summers painting.

In 1870, he joined with Grigoriy Myasoyedov to create the "Peredvizhniki" (Association of Traveling Art Exhibitions). He was briefly expelled from the Association for failing to provide work on time, but rejoined in 1879, eventually becoming a board member and Treasurer.

While still a member of the Artel, he accepted an invitation to give private drawing lessons to the children of future Tsar Alexander III and continued to do so for many years. Olga Alkexandrovna turned out to be his best student there, and retained an interest in art for the rest of her life. He became a member of the academy in 1893, received a life pension and became a curator for the art collection at the Russian Museum until his retirement in 1909.

Selected paintings

References

Further reading 
 N. M. Bykovsky, "Kirill Vikentevich Lemokh. (In Memory of a Long Friendship), Московский еженедельник (Journal), Moscow 1910, #14, pgs.23-30 
 Y. D. Minchenkov,  Воспоминания о передвижниках (Memories of the Itinerant), fifth edition, Saint Petersburg, Художник РСФСР, 1964, pgs.68-76

External links 

 Kirill (Karl) Lemokh portal @ "Воскресный день" (Sunday Afternoon)
 Karl Lemokh @ "Энциклопедии живописи и графики Art-каталог" (Encyclopedia of Painting and Graphics Art Directory)

1841 births
1910 deaths
Russian genre painters
19th-century painters from the Russian Empire
20th-century Russian painters
Russian male painters
19th-century male artists from the Russian Empire
20th-century Russian male artists
Moscow School of Painting, Sculpture and Architecture alumni